Preston is a city in Fillmore County, Minnesota, United States. The population was 1,325 at the 2010 census. It is the county seat of Fillmore County. The Root River runs through it, and Mystery Cave State Park is nearby. It bills itself as "America's Trout Capital," with a 20-foot trout  placed along Minnesota State Highway 16.

History
Preston was platted in 1855. The community was named for Luther Preston, a millwright and postmaster. The old Preston grain elevator used to be known as the Milwaukee Elevator Company Grain Elevator. It was built around 1890 for holding grain for shipment by railroad to the Eastern cities of the United States. The elevator was last used in the 1980s. It was built with "cribbed" construction, which has to do with interlocking bins.  At the time it was a lot stronger and a lot more expensive to build it this way than to build it in stud construction. Now the Preston Historical Society is trying to restore the structure.

The Preston Overlook was built in 1937 by the Minnesota Department of Highways under the program of Federal Relief Construction during the New Deal.  A site was chosen on the highest point on the bluffs above the Root River, 90 feet below.  The Preston Overlook was listed on the National Register of Historic Places in 2003.

Geography
The South Branch of the Root River snakes through the city.

U.S. Highway 52 and Minnesota Highway 16 are two of the main routes in the city.

Climate

According to the Köppen Climate Classification system, Preston has a warm-summer humid continental climate, abbreviated "Dfb" on climate maps.

Demographics

2010 census
As of the census of 2010, there were 1,325 people, 603 households, and 361 families living in the city. The racial makeup of the city was 98.3% White, 0.2% African American, 0.2% Native American, 0.2% Asian, and 1.1% from two or more races. Hispanic or Latino of any race were 0.6% of the population.

There were 603 households, of which 24.9% had children under the age of 18 living with them, 47.3% were married couples living together, 8.6% had a female householder with no husband present, 4.0% had a male householder with no wife present, and 40.1% were non-families. 36.3% of all households were made up of individuals, and 16.6% had someone living alone who was 65 years of age or older. The average household size was 2.15 and the average family size was 2.79.

The median age in the city was 43.8 years. 21.4% of residents were under the age of 18; 7.4% were between the ages of 18 and 24; 22.5% were from 25 to 44; 28% were from 45 to 64; and 20.8% were 65 years of age or older. The gender makeup of the city was 49.4% male and 50.6% female.

2000 census
As of the census of 2000, there were 1,426 people, 583 households, and 374 families living in the city. The racial makeup of the city was 98.95% White, 0.14% African American, 0.14% Native American, 0.14% Asian, 0.14% from other races, and 0.49% from two or more races. Hispanic or Latino of any race were 0.42% of the population.

There were 583 households, out of which 28.8% had children under the age of 18 living with them, 54.9% were married couples living together, 6.2% had a female householder with no husband present, and 35.8% were non-families. 32.9% of all households were made up of individuals, and 15.8% had someone living alone who was 65 years of age or older.  The average household size was 2.28 and the average family size was 2.89.

In the city, the population was spread out, with 23.5% under the age of 18, 5.3% from 18 to 24, 26.2% from 25 to 44, 20.8% from 45 to 64, and 24.2% who were 65 years of age or older.  The median age was 42 years. For every 100 females, there were 101.1 males.  For every 100 females age 18 and over, there were 97.6 males.

The median income for a household in the city was $37,016, and the median income for a family was $50,234. Males had a median income of $30,463 versus $21,520 for females. The per capita income for the city was $18,578.  About 4.3% of families and 8.3% of the population were below the poverty line, including 9.0% of those under age 18 and 15.0% of those age 65 or over.

Trail connection
Preston is intersected by the Harmony-Preston Valley segment of the Blufflands State Trail.

Education
Fillmore Central School District (#2198) is a public school district that has two schools in Preston. Those schools are the Elementary (pre-kindergarten- fourth grade) and Middle Schools (fifth - sixth grade). The High School (seventh-twelfth grade) is located in nearby Harmony, Minnesota. For the school years of 2005–06, their enrollment is 641 students.  Fillmore Central's predicted total enrollment is 604 students for the school years of 2006–07.

See also
Preston Public Library

References

External links

Preston Schools

Cities in Fillmore County, Minnesota
County seats in Minnesota
Cities in Minnesota
Populated places established in 1855
1855 establishments in Minnesota Territory